Melanimonini is a tribe of darkling beetles in the family Tenebrionidae. There are at least three genera in Melanimonini.

Genera
These genera belong to the tribe Melanimonini:
 Cheirodes Gené, 1839  (North America, the Palearctic, tropical Africa, and Australasia)
 Dolamara Reichardt, 1935  (the Palearctic)
 Melanimon Steven, 1828  (the Palearctic)

References

Further reading

External links

 

Tenebrionoidea